Khaled Gasmi (born 8 April 1953) is a Tunisian football midfielder who played for Tunisia in the 1978 FIFA World Cup. He also played for Club Athlétique Bizertin.

References

External links
FIFA profile

1953 births
Tunisian footballers
Tunisia international footballers
Association football midfielders
1978 FIFA World Cup players
AS Ariana players
CA Bizertin players
Competitors at the 1975 Mediterranean Games
Mediterranean Games bronze medalists for Tunisia
Living people
1978 African Cup of Nations players
Mediterranean Games medalists in football